Ramsey Bay is an unincorporated community and resort subdivision within northern Saskatchewan, Canada. It is recognized as a designated place by Statistics Canada.

Geography 
Ramsey Bay is on the western shore of Weyakwin Lake.

Demographics 

References 

Division No. 18, Saskatchewan
Designated places in Saskatchewan